Bob Owens (born ) is an American former college football player and coach. He served as the interim head football coach at Arizona State University for the final seven games of the 1979 season after the firing of Frank Kush, compiling a record of 3–4.

Head coaching record

References

Year of birth missing (living people)
1930s births
Living people
American football halfbacks
Arizona State Sun Devils football coaches
Fresno State Bulldogs football coaches
Fresno State Bulldogs football players
Arizona State University alumni